Mackville is an unincorporated community in Lincoln County, in the U.S. state of Missouri.

History
A post office called Mackville was established in 1877, and remained in operation until 1902. The community derives its name from one "Mack" McElwel.

References

Unincorporated communities in Lincoln County, Missouri
Unincorporated communities in Missouri